Inchyra ("the west isle") is a hamlet in the Carse of Gowrie in Scotland. It lies on the northern bank of the River Tay near Perth and is notable particularly for a number of archaeological finds made in the immediate vicinity.

Geography
Inchyra lies on the northern bank of the River Tay to the south of the A90. It is situated close to St Madoes. It is the only L-shaped village in Scotland. It is surrounded by farmland.

Toponymy
In common with a number of villages in the Carse of Gowrie, Inchyra has the Celtic placename element innis meaning "island". Carses such as the Carse of Gowrie are estuarine landforms that have been uplifted by isostatic rebound following the last glacial period. It is likely that Inchyra was an island in the firth of Tay at the time of its settlement.

Inchyra Stone
In 1945 a class I Pictish stone was unearthed during ploughing in a field at Inchyra. The stone is inscribed with a variety of Pictish symbols, including a double disc, mirror and comb, two fish and a serpent as well as an Ogham inscription. It is now on display at Perth Museum.

Roman archaeology
In June 1993, a small hoard of eight Roman Denarii coins were discovered at Inchyra, subsequently being declared as treasure trove and placed in Perth Museum. A Roman brooch with blue enamel inlay has also been found in river silt at Inchyra, again now displayed at Perth Museum.

See also
Carse of Gowrie
Frederick Millar, 1st Baron Inchyra
Perth, Scotland
St Madoes

Gallery

References

External links
Photograph of Inchyra Stone
Photograph of Inchyra Stone (reverse)

Villages in Perth and Kinross